is a former Japanese football player. He played for Japan national team.

Club career
Suzuki was born in Saitama on September 20, 1939. After graduating from Rikkyo University, he joined Hitachi in 1962. In 1965, Hitachi joined new league Japan Soccer League. He retired in 1970. He played 67 games and scored 5 goals in the league.

National team career
On August 15, 1961, when Suzuki was a Rikkyo University student, he debuted for Japan national team against Indonesia. In 1964, he was selected Japan for 1964 Summer Olympics in Tokyo and he played all matches. In 1968, he was also selected Japan for 1968 Summer Olympics in Mexico City. Although he did not play in the match, Japan won Bronze Medal. In 2018, this team was selected Japan Football Hall of Fame. He also played at 1962 and 1966 Asian Games. He played 24 games for Japan until 1968.

In 2010, Suzuki was selected Japan Football Hall of Fame.

Personal life
Chiharu Saitō from the Japanese girl idol group Nogizaka46 is Suzuki's great niece.

Club statistics

National team statistics

References

External links

 
 Japan National Football Team Database
Japan Football Hall of Fame at Japan Football Association
Japan Football Hall of Fame (Japan team at 1968 Olympics) at Japan Football Association

1939 births
Living people
Rikkyo University alumni
Association football people from Saitama Prefecture
Japanese footballers
Japan international footballers
Japan Soccer League players
Kashiwa Reysol players
Olympic footballers of Japan
Footballers at the 1964 Summer Olympics
Footballers at the 1968 Summer Olympics
Olympic bronze medalists for Japan
Olympic medalists in football
Medalists at the 1968 Summer Olympics
Asian Games medalists in football
Asian Games bronze medalists for Japan
Footballers at the 1962 Asian Games
Footballers at the 1966 Asian Games
Association football defenders
Medalists at the 1966 Asian Games